Alanna Koch is a Canadian civil servant and politician in the province of Saskatchewan.  She previously ran for the leadership of the governing Saskatchewan Party, losing to Scott Moe on the fifth ballot.

Early life

Koch grew up on a farm near Edenwold, Saskatchewan, northeast of Regina.  She attended the University of Saskatchewan.

Career

Koch held several political positions in the Saskatchewan legislative building under the Progressive Conservative government of Premier Grant Devine.  Upon the defeat of the Devine government in 1991, Koch accepted a position as Executive Director of the Western Canadian Wheat Growers Association.  Later, she served on the Board of Directors of Agricore United, and then as President of the Canadian Agri-Food Alliance.

After the Saskatchewan Party won the province's general election of 2007, she was appointed Deputy Minister of Agriculture.  In 2016 she was appointed to the position of Deputy Minister to the Premier in Saskatchewan, the first woman to hold this position

2018 leadership election

On August 28, 2017, Koch announced her bid for the leadership of the Saskatchewan Party just days after party leader and Premier Brad Wall announced that he was retiring from politics. She took a leave of absence from her position as Deputy Minister to the Premier, vacating her seat to Kent Campbell. On January 27, 2018, she lost the leadership race for the Saskatchewan party to Scott Moe.

Personal life
Koch is married to Gerry Hertz and has two grown daughters, Shayla and Keisha.  They farm near Edenwold.

References 

Year of birth missing (living people)
Living people
Saskatchewan Party politicians
Farmers from Saskatchewan